Burg Schlaining is a castle in Stadtschlaining in the Austrian state of Burgenland.

See also
List of castles in Austria

References

External links
 Castle Schlaining - visiting information

Castles in Burgenland
Museums in Burgenland
Historic house museums in Austria